Beale is an English surname. At the time of the British Census of 1881, its relative frequency was highest in Dorset (6.3 times the British average), followed by Huntingdonshire, Hampshire, Sussex, Oxfordshire, Wiltshire, Warwickshire, Kent and Surrey.

The name Beale may refer to:

People 
Anthony Beale (born 1967), American politician, alderman in Chicago
Bernard Charles Beale (1830–1910), New Zealand doctor and politician 
Charles Lewis Beale (1824–1900), member of U.S. House of Representatives from New York
Daniel Beale (1759–1842), Scottish merchant, brother of Thomas Beale
Dorothea Beale (1831–1906), English teacher, founder of St. Hilda's College, Oxford
Edith Bouvier Beale (1917–2002), American socialite, first cousin of Jacqueline Kennedy Onassis and Lee Radziwill
Edward Fitzgerald Beale (1822–1893), American frontiersman and diplomat
Fleur Beale (born 1945), New Zealand teenage fiction writer best known for her novel I am not Esther
Gerard Beale, New Zealand rugby league player
Gregory Beale (born 1949), Reformed Christian theologian and seminary professor
Helen Purdy Beale (1893–1976), US virologist
Howard Beale (politician) (1898–1983), Australian politician and Ambassador to the United States
Howard K. Beale (1899–1959), American historian and author
Inga Beale, CEO of Lloyd's of London
Jack Beale (1917–2006), Australian politician
James Beale (1835–1883), also known as Africanus Horton, Sierra Leonean writer and folklorist
James Thomas Beale (born 1947), American mathematician
John Elmes Beale (1847–1928), English politician, three times Mayor of Bournemouth and founder of its largest department store, Beales
John Beale (disambiguation), multiple people
Joseph Henry Beale, Harvard Law professor and conflict of laws scholar
Julian Beale (1934–2021), Australian politician
Kurtley Beale (born 1989), Australian rugby union player
Lionel Smith Beale (1828–1906), British medical doctor and professor at King's College London
Margaret Beale (1886–1969), British marine artist
Maria Taylor Beale (1849–1929), American author
Martin Beale (1928–1985), British pioneer of mathematical programming
Mary Beale (1633–1699), English portrait painter
Octavius Beale (1850–1930), Irish piano manufacturer and philanthropist
Philippa Beale (born 1946), British artist
Richard L. T. Beale (1819–1893), American lawyer, Congressman from Virginia, and brigadier general in Confederate States Army
Simon Russell Beale (born 1961), British actor
Sophia Beale (1837–1920), English artist
Theodore Beale (born c.1968) American writer
Thomas Beale (c. 1775 – 1841), Scottish naturalist and opium speculator, brother of Daniel Beale
Thomas Chaye Beale (19th century), Scottish merchant, cousin of Daniel and Thomas Beale
Thomas Willert Beale (1828–1894), English writer, also wrote under the pseudonym Walter Maynard
William Beale (1784–1854), British composer

As given name
Beale M. Schmucker (1827–1888), American Lutheran leader and liturgical scholar

Characters
Howard Beale, played by Peter Finch in the film Network
Livia Beale, played by Moon Bloodgood in the TV series Journeyman
Chloe Beale, played by Brittany Snow in the film Pitch Perfect

EastEnders
Beale family
 Albert Beale
 Bobby Beale (EastEnders)
 Cindy Beale
 Elizabeth Beale
 Harry Beale
 Ian Beale
 Jane Beale
 Kathy Beale
 Kenny Beale
 Laura Beale
 Lou Beale
 Louie Beale
 Lucy Beale
 Melanie Beale
 Pete Beale
 Peter Beale
 Ronnie Beale
 Steven Beale

See also
Beal (surname)
Beall, a surname
Beel (disambiguation)
Bheel (disambiguation)
Biehl, surname

Notes

English-language surnames
Surnames of English origin